Augraben is a small river of Hesse, Germany. It is a left tributary of the Liederbach in Oberliederbach.

See also
List of rivers of Hesse

Rivers of Hesse
Rivers of the Taunus
Rivers of Germany